Charles B. Yates (September 27, 1939 – October 6, 2000) was an American politician who served in the New Jersey General Assembly from 1972 to 1978 and in the New Jersey Senate from 1978 to 1982.

A resident of Edgewater Park, New Jersey, he died in a plane crash on October 6, 2000, in Martha's Vineyard, Massachusetts.

References

1939 births
2000 deaths
Accidental deaths in Massachusetts
Democratic Party members of the New Jersey General Assembly
Democratic Party New Jersey state senators
People from Edgewater Park, New Jersey
Politicians from Burlington County, New Jersey
Victims of aviation accidents or incidents in the United States
Victims of aviation accidents or incidents in 2000
20th-century American politicians